Syrian Uruguayans are Uruguayan citizens of Syrian descent or Syrian-born naturalized Uruguayans.

Historical background
Uruguay has several thousands of people with Arab descent, whose ancestors came mostly from Lebanon; a minority came also from Syria. 

There were Muslims, Christians, and also some Jews among them.

New wave of immigration in the 21st century
As of October 2014, Uruguay received a new immigration flow of Syrian people, this time as a consequence of the Syrian Civil War. 42 Syrian people from five families were received by President José Mujica on 9 October. Because of allegedly insufficient support by the government, some Syrians prostested in 2015 and requested visa to leave the country. One family reportedly tried to leave Uruguay via Serbia in August 2015 but was sent back because of missing visa.

Notable Syrian Uruguayans 
 Amir Hamed (1962-2017), translator
 Jorge Antonio Chibene (1917–2007), businessman and political figure
 Amin Niffouri (born 1971), politician
Raquel Daruech (born 1953), journalist

See also
Syrian diaspora
Immigration to Uruguay
Lebanese Uruguayans
Arab Uruguayans

References

Uruguay
Arab Uruguayan 
 
Ethnic groups in Uruguay
Immigration to Uruguay
Syria–Uruguay relations